Elaeidinae is a subtribe of plants in the family Arecaceae found in tropical South America and Africa. Genera in the subtribe are:

Barcella – northern Brazil; monotypic genus
Elaeis – Africa, northern South America

See also 
 List of Arecaceae genera

References

External links 

 
Arecaceae subtribes